Rosa 'Line Renaud' is a hybrid tea rose cultivar bred in France by Meilland International SA and introduced in 2006. It was named for French actress Line Renaud.

'Line Renaud' was developed at the Meilland-Richardier research center in Le Cannet-des-Maures. It is the result of a crossing in the year 1997, germinated in 1998 and was successively selected from thousands of seedlings in several stages. Its combination of fragrance and health was described as rare by Andreas Barlage. Klaus Körber described the citrus fragrance as superb and popular with customers.

The rose flowers repeatedly beginning in May or June. The bloom has been described as pink, dark pink, or fuchsia-colored in the style of old roses or resembling a peony. The petals are firm, which allows the flower to stay in shape in rain, the inner petals are sometimes whirled or quartered, and petals often have a thin light border and are sometimes crenated. The shrub is very thorny, branches only below flowers, and has large green to dark green foliage. Its habit is upright and bushy. 

'Line Renaud' does not develop hips and does not self-clean in cold or damp weather. Bauer and Grothe suggest planting the rose in small groups and near to seats because of its fragrance. Barlage suggests a combination with garden heliotrope, sweet alyssum, and trumpet lilies. Bauer and Grothe propose combining the rose with rose mallow. Cut flowers of 'Line Renaud' last for a week. The cultivar can grow excessive shoots and gives a middling appearance in a container.

'Line Renaud' won the Golden Rose of the City Hradec Králové in 2007, became an ADR rose in 2007, won a Silver Medal and Most Fragrant Rose at the 2008 Australian National Rose Trials, and won the 2009 Grand Prix de la Rose in all categories by the National Horticultural Society of France.

References

External links

HelpMeFind: 'Line Renaud' Rose

Plants described in 2006
Products introduced in 2006
Line Renaud